Horahora may refer to the following entities in New Zealand:

 Horahora, Waikato, a locality southeast of Cambridge; see Waikato River Trails
 Horahora, Whangarei, a suburb of Whangarei
 Horahora Power Station, a defunct power station now submerged by Lake Karapiro
 Horahora River, Northland

See also
 Hora Hora RFC, a rugby club based in Whangarei
 Hara horai, a species of South Asian river catfish
 Hora Hori, a 2016 Indian Telugu-language film